This is a list of schools in the Royal Borough of Kingston upon Thames in London, England.

State-funded schools

Primary schools
CE indicates Church of England, and RC indicates Roman Catholic.

Alexandra School   	    
Burlington Infant School
Burlington Junior School
Castle Hill Primary School
Christ Church CE Primary School
Christ Church New Malden CE Primary School
Coombe Hill Infant School
Coombe Hill Junior School
Corpus Christi RC School  
Ellingham Primary School
Fern Hill Primary School 
Grand Avenue Primary School
Green Lane Primary School
King Athelstan Primary School
King's Oak Primary School
Kingston Community School
Knollmead Primary School
Latchmere School
Lime Tree Primary School
Lovelace Primary School
Malden Manor Primary School
Malden Parochial CE School
Maple Infants' School
Our Lady Immaculate RC School
Robin Hood Primary School
St Agatha's RC Primary School
St Andrew's and St Mark's CE Junior School
St John's CE Primary School
St Joseph's RC Primary School
St Luke's CE Primary School
St Mary's CE Primary School
St Matthew's CE Primary School
St Paul's CE Primary School, Chessington
St Paul's CE Primary School, Kingston Hill
Tolworth Infant School
Tolworth Junior School

Non-selective secondary schools
RC indicates Roman Catholic.

Chessington School 
Coombe Boys' School 
Coombe Girls' School
Hollyfield School 
Holy Cross School (Girls) (RC)
The Kingston Academy
Richard Challoner School (Boys) (RC)
Southborough High School (Boys)
Tolworth Girls' School

Grammar schools
Tiffin Girls' School
Tiffin School (Boys)

Special and alternative schools
Bedelsford School
Dysart School
Malden Oaks School and Tuition Service 
St Philip's School

Further education
Kingston College
Richmond and Hillcroft Adult Community College

Independent schools

Primary and preparatory schools
Age range of pupils in brackets. RC indicates Roman Catholic.

Educare Small School (3-11)
Holy Cross Preparatory School (RC, girls 4-11)
Liberty Woodland School (4-11)
Park Hill School (2-11)
Rokeby Preparatory School (boys 4-13)
Shrewsbury House School (boys 7-13)
Study School (3-11)
Westbury House School (3-11)

Senior and all-through schools
Age range of pupils in brackets. RC indicates Roman Catholic.
Canbury School (11-16)
Kingston Grammar School (10-18)
Marymount International School London (RC, girls 11-18)
Surbiton High School (girls 4-18, boys 4-11)
Tennis Avenue School (8-16)

References

Kingston
Schools in the Royal Borough of Kingston upon Thames